An ecclesial community is, in the terminology used by the Catholic Church, a Christian religious group that does not meet the Catholic definition of a "Church". Although the word "ecclesial" itself means "church" or "gathering" in a political sense in Koine Greek, the Catholic Church applies the term "Church" in the proper sense only to Christian communities that, in the Catholic Church's view, "have true sacraments and above all – because of the apostolic succession – the priesthood and the Eucharist".

The Catholic Church formally recognizes as "Churches" of a nature similar to its own particular Churches (dioceses and autonomous or sui iuris Churches) the Eastern Churches separated from full communion with it, namely those of Eastern Orthodoxy, Oriental Orthodoxy, and Church of the East. It has not denied the claim of some communities of Western Christianity to meet its definition of "Church" (an example is the Polish National Catholic Church). Indeed, by referring to "The Separated Churches and Ecclesial Communities in the West," the Second Vatican Council recognized the existence of some Western Churches that are not in full communion with the Holy See.

However, the Catholic Church expressly excludes "those Christian communities born out of the Reformation of the sixteenth century," since, according to Catholic doctrine, these communities do not enjoy apostolic succession in the sacrament of orders, and therefore lack a constitutive element of the Church. This includes the Anglican Communion, the validity of whose orders the Roman Catholic Church has declared "absolutely null and utterly void". This judgement, as enunciated in the papal bull Apostolicae curae of 1896, has been given as an example of a truth connected to revelation that is to be held definitively.

Criticism of the label 
After Cardinal Joseph Ratzinger promulgated the document Dominus Iesus in 2000, several leaders from the Church of Denmark replied in a public statement, saying in part:

Ecclesial Communities in Formation 
Other forms of the term ecclesial community refers to those communities that are in formation to become missions of a particular church or parishes of a particular diocese, or eparchy. Ecclesial communities can refer to groups of individuals who gather for a spiritual reason, primarily for worship and fellowship that typically does not receive sacraments unless a sacramental minister, i.e., a priest or deacon, is available.

References

Christian terminology